Heo Yong-joon (Hanja: 許熔埈; born 8 January 1993) is a South Korean footballer who plays as forward for Vegalta Sendai.

Career
Heo joined K League 1 side Jeonnam Dragons in January 2016.

On March 23, 2017, he made his debut as a substitute for the South Korea national team in the 39th minute of the second half of the away match against China in the 3rd round of the Asian qualifiers for the FIFA World Cup in Russia.

References

External links 

1993 births
Living people
Association football forwards
South Korean footballers
Jeonnam Dragons players
Incheon United FC players
Pohang Steelers players
Gimcheon Sangmu FC players
K League 1 players
K League 2 players
Korea University alumni
People from Yeosu
Sportspeople from South Jeolla Province